Daniel Amihud Lidar is the holder of the Viterbi Professorship of Engineering at the University of Southern California, where he is a Professor of Electrical Engineering, Chemistry, Physics & Astronomy. He is the Director and co-founder of the USC Center for Quantum Information Science & Technology (CQIST) as well as Scientific Director of the USC-Lockheed Martin Quantum Computing Center, notable for his research on control of quantum systems and quantum information processing.

Education
He is a class of 1986 graduate of the Armand Hammer United World College of the American West. He obtained his PhD from the Hebrew University of Jerusalem in 1997 under Robert Benny Gerber  and Ofer Biham, with a thesis entitled Structural Characterization of Disordered Systems.

Career
In 1997–2000, he was a postdoc at UC Berkeley, having been awarded Rothschild Foundation and Fulbright Program fellowships (the latter of which he declined); in 2000–2005, he was an assistant professor and then later an associate professor of Chemistry at the University of Toronto, with cross-appointments in Physics and Mathematics. He moved to the University of Southern California in 2005, where he is a Professor of Electrical Engineering, Chemistry, and Physics.

Honors
He was a 2017 Guggenheim Fellowship recipient, a 2007 Fellow of the American Physical Society, a 2012 Fellow of the American Association for the Advancement of Science, and 2015 Fellow of the IEEE. He is listed as one of the top 20 authors of the decade 2000–2009 in Quantum Computing by Thomson Reuters' Sciencewatch. In 2009 he was elected an Outstanding Referee  of the American Physical Society. His early career awards include a Sloan Foundation Fellowship, the Young Explorer Award given by the Canadian Institute for Advanced Research for the top 20 researchers in Canada under age 40, and the John Charles Polanyi Prize in Chemistry awarded by the Ontario Council of Graduate Studies.

Research
He has made numerous contributions to quantum computing and quantum control, and is the coeditor and coauthor of a book on quantum error correction. His current work focuses on adiabatic quantum computing and quantum annealing, areas where he has made widely cited contributions to studying the capabilities of the D-Wave Systems processors. His past interests include scattering theory and fractals. Lidar's research in quantum information processing has focused primarily on methods for overcoming decoherence. He wrote some of the founding papers on decoherence-free subspaces, most notably his widely cited paper "Decoherence-free subspaces for quantum computation", and their generalization, noiseless subsystems. These contributions were noted in his APS Fellow citation. He has also made major contributions to dynamical decoupling, in particular the invention of the concatenated dynamical decoupling (CDD) method. He has made a proposal to protect adiabatic quantum computation against decoherence, using dynamical decoupling, one of the only proposals to date dealing with error correction for the adiabatic model. Lidar has also worked on quantum algorithms, having written some of the pioneering papers in the subject on simulation of classical statistical mechanics and quantum chemistry. In his PhD work he made a widely cited observation on the limited scaling range of empirically observed fractals, which led to an exchange with Benoit Mandelbrot.

Patents
He holds four U.S. patents in the area of quantum computing.

Publications 
 Quantum Aspects of Life (book), 2008, section co-author
 "Attack of the quantum worms", New Scientist, October 29, 2005, pp. 30–33
 "Single field shapes quantum bits", Technology Research News, November 3/10, 2004
 "Sturdy quantum computing demoed", Technology Research News, April 7/14, 2004
 "World Computations", Lifestyles Magazine Vol. 31, No. 182, 2002, pp. 38–40 (an interview)
 "Quantum Protection", NSERC Newsbureau Bulletin No. 46, published April 25, 2002
 "A quantum leap in the way computers think", Toronto Star, March 28, 2002, National Report section
 "Alternative quantum bits go natural", Technology Research News, April 2001
 "Quantum Computers", Chemical & Engineering News cover story, November 2000
 "Haven for Quantum Computation", Science, Editor’s Choice, September 2000
 "Quantum Computing for Chemists", New Scientist, August 1998

References 

 Sciencewatch lists of top 20 authors in Quantum Computing
 Rothschild Fellowship
 Sloan Research Fellowship 
 APS Fellowship
 AAAS Fellowship
 IEEE Fellowship

External links
 Wired interview with Lidar
 Sciencewatch interview with Lidar
  Lidar's USC profile
 Lidar's homepage
 Lidar at the ACM portal
 Lidar's math genealogy
 Lidar's Qwiki profile
 Center for Quantum Information Science & Technology (CQIST) at USC
 USC Lockheed-Martin Quantum Computation Center

Living people
Fellows of the American Physical Society
Fellows of the American Association for the Advancement of Science
Fellow Members of the IEEE
Quantum physicists
American people of Israeli descent
21st-century American physicists
21st-century American engineers
University of Southern California faculty
Academic staff of the University of Toronto
1968 births
Hebrew University of Jerusalem alumni
People from Jerusalem
People educated at a United World College